Anna Paulowna railway station serves the town of Anna Paulowna, Netherlands. The station opened on 20 December 1865 and the station is on the Den Helder–Amsterdam railway. The train services are operated by Nederlandse Spoorwegen.

Train services
The station is served by the following service(s):

2x per hour Intercity services Den Helder - Amsterdam - Utrecht - Arnhem - Nijmegen

Bus services
The following bus services stop at Anna Paulowna NS:

References

External links
NS website 
Dutch public transport travel planner 

Railway stations in North Holland
Railway stations opened in 1865
Railway stations on the Staatslijn K
Hollands Kroon